Waterford is a parliamentary constituency represented in Dáil Éireann, the lower house of the Irish parliament or Oireachtas. The constituency elects 4 deputies (Teachtaí Dála, commonly known as TDs) on the system of proportional representation by means of the single transferable vote (PR-STV).

History and boundaries
The constituency was created by the Electoral Act 1923 and first used at the 1923 general election to the 4th Dáil, partially replacing the constituency of Waterford–Tipperary East that was used for the previous two elections.

The Electoral (Amendment) (Dáil Constituencies) Act 2017 defines the constituency as:

TDs

Elections

2020 general election

2016 general election

2011 general election

2007 general election

2002 general election

1997 general election

1992 general election

1989 general election

1987 general election

November 1982 general election

February 1982 general election

1981 general election

1977 general election

1973 general election

1969 general election

1966 by-election
Following the death of Fine Gael TD Thaddeus Lynch a by-election was held on 7 December 1966. The seat was won by the Fianna Fáil candidate Patrick (Fad) Browne.

1965 general election

1961 general election

1957 general election

1954 general election

1952 by-election
Following the death of Fine Gael TD Bridget Redmond, a by-election was held on 26 June 1952. The seat was won by the Fianna Fáil candidate William Kenneally.

1951 general election

1948 general election

1947 by-election
Following the death of Fianna Fáil TD Michael Morrissey, a by-election was held on 29 October 1947. The seat was won by the Fianna Fáil candidate John Ormonde.

1944 general election

1943 general election

1938 general election

1937 general election

1933 general election

1932 general election

September 1927 general election

June 1927 general election

1923 general election

See also
Dáil constituencies
Elections in the Republic of Ireland
Politics of the Republic of Ireland
List of Dáil by-elections
List of political parties in the Republic of Ireland

References

Dáil constituencies
Politics of County Waterford
1923 establishments in Ireland
Constituencies established in 1923